Karl Otto Christe (born July 24, 1936) is an inorganic chemist. He is the best reference in respectful handling of a huge number of extremely reactive components and his extensive experience in fluorine chemistry earned him the title of 'The Fluorine God'. His research covers fluorine chemistry of nitrogen and halogens and the synthesis of new energetic materials.

Life
In 1957 Christe began his chemistry studies at the University of Stuttgart. He prepared both his diploma- (1960) and PhD theses (1961) under the supervision of Josef Goubeau. 
In 1962, Christe immigrated to the US and settled in California. He started working as a senior research chemist with Stauffer Chemical Co in Richmond/CA. In 1967 he joined Rocketdyne Division Rockwell International in Canoga Park where he became the manager of research in 1978. In 1994 he accepted split positions between the Air Force Research Laboratory at Edwards Air Force Base and the Loker Hydrocarbon Research Institute of USC. In 2005, he moved full-time to USC where he is working as a research professor.

Work
Since the 1960s, Christe has been investigating the synthesis of new fluorides of nitrogen, halogen, and the halogen oxides, as well as their ions.  Notable examples are the syntheses of both NF4+ and ClF6+.  On the occasion of the 100th anniversary of Henri Moissan's first production of fluorine, Christe in 1986 reported about the first truly chemical synthesis of fluorine.  Another important field of his work covers the research on homoleptic nitrogen compounds for use in energetic materials.  In this context, he synthesized the bent pentazenium cation, N5+, and was the first to experimentally detect the cyclic pentazolate anion, N5− and to prepare stable high nitrogen pentazolates.  Both compounds are considered important milestones on the way to even heavier polynitrogen compounds.  In 1996, Christe was the first to propose the use of ionic liquids as energetic materials in propulsion systems.  He is currently working on the development of oxidizers to replace the dangerous ammonium perchlorate.  Christe has authored over 400 peer-review publications, and has more than 60 patents.

Awards
1969: Apollo Achievement Award, NASA
1986: ACS National Award in Fluorine Chemistry, American Chemical Society (ACS)
1999: Star Team Award, US Air Force
2000: Henri Moissan Award, Institution du Prix Moissan, Paris
2003: ACS National Award in Inorganic Chemistry Award, ACS
2006: Alfred Stock Preis, Gesellschaft Deutscher Chemiker, 
2010: European Academy of Sciences and Arts, Salzburg
2011: Richard C. Tolman Award, ACS
2015: ACS National Award for Creative Research and Applications of Iodine Chemistry
2017: Fellow of the American Association for the Advancement of Science
2021: ACS National Award M. Frederick Hawthorne Award in Main Group Inorganic Chemistry

Publications (selection)

The hexafluorochlorine (VII) cation, CIF6+, K. O. Christe, Inorg. Nucl. Chem. Lett. 8, 751, (1972)

References

External links
Chem.usc.edu
Pressrealtions.de
Scalacs.org
Bcf.usc.edu
ACS 2015 National Awards
80th Birthday of Karl O. Christe 

1936 births
Living people
German emigrants to the United States
People from Ulm
University of Southern California faculty